Michael W. Dickinson (born 3 February 1950 in Yorkshire, England) is a retired Champion Thoroughbred racehorse trainer.

Having been educated at Rossall School, Dickinson was an amateur champion rider before becoming a professional jockey for 10 years. His rides included a Classic winner, Boucher.  Lester Piggot rode Boucher when it won the 1972 St Leger at Doncaster.

Training career

Dickinson got his trainer's licence in 1980, taking over his parents' stables. He trained at Dunkeswick near Harewood in Yorkshire and was the Champion Trainer of National Hunt racing for three years in England. Two of his formative years were spent under the tutelage of Vincent O'Brien, the legendary Irish trainer who was master of Ballydoyle, the training center in County Tipperary.

Michael Dickinson is perhaps most famous for his extraordinary feat of training the first five in the 1983 Cheltenham Gold Cup. In order: Bregawn, Captain John, Wayward Lad, Silver Buck, and Ashley House. The BBC has an interesting account of Dickinson's Famous Five.  
He also trained a record 12 winners on Boxing Day in 1982, both of which are in the Guinness Book of World Records. He has three other further world records noted in the Guinness Book of World Records.

Dickinson also briefly trained flat racing horses for Robert Sangster before emigrating to Maryland in the U.S., where he had his first runner on 30 June 1987.

In 1993, he was elected to the British Steeplechasing Hall of Fame and inducted on its opening in 1994.

Dickinson's most acclaimed flat training feat came with Da Hoss.  He trained the horse to win the 1996 and 1998 Breeders' Cup Mile despite the horse only having had one race in between, owing to injury.

On 13 November 2007, Michael Dickinson announced that he would not apply for a trainer's licence in 2008, in order to devote his time to his business of synthetic racetrack surfacing known as Tapeta Footings.

References

External links
 Michael Dickinson at the NTRA
 Michael Dickinson page
 13 November 2007 Sporting Life story and profile on Michael Dickinson titled Dickinson Ends Training Career

British jockeys
British racehorse trainers
American racehorse trainers
1950 births
Living people
People educated at Rossall School
Sportspeople from Yorkshire